The 1996 Liverpool Victoria Charity Challenge was the second edition of the professional invitational snooker tournament, which took place in January 1996. The tournament was played at the International Convention Centre in Birmingham, England, and featured sixteen professional players.

Ronnie O'Sullivan won the title, beating John Higgins 9–6 in the final.


Main draw

References

Champions Cup (snooker)
1996 in snooker
1996 in English sport